Leszkowice  is a village in the administrative district of Gmina Ostrówek, within Lubartów County, Lublin Voivodeship, in eastern Poland.

The village has a population of 930.

References

Leszkowice